Miracle Records was an independent American record label, established in Chicago, Illinois, United States, in 1946 to record and issue rhythm and blues, jazz and gospel music.

The company was established in August 1946 by Chicago-born businessman Lee L. Egalnick (1921–2000).  It released records by musicians including Rudi Richardson, Memphis Slim, Sonny Thompson, Piney Brown, Gladys Palmer, Eddie Chamblee, Al Hibbler, and Robert Anderson.

In 1948, Memphis Slim's "Messin' Around", and Sonny Thompson's "Long Gone" and "Late Freight" all made No. 1 on the US Billboard R&B chart. (known at the time as the "Race Records" chart).

Egalnick left the label in 1950 to found Premium Records, and his associate Lew Simpkins soon followed, closing the label down.

The name was later used by unrelated record labels in Australia and the UK during the 1970s.

References

External links
Discography
Miracle Records on the Internet Archive's Great 78 Project

American record labels
Blues record labels
Jazz record labels
Record labels established in 1946
Record labels disestablished in 1950
Rhythm and blues record labels
1946 establishments in Illinois